Büşra Mutay (born 7 February 1990 in Biga) is a Turkish track and field athlete competing in long jump and triple jump.

International competitions

Personal bests

Last updated 28 July 2015.

References



Living people
1990 births
Turkish female long jumpers
Turkish female triple jumpers